Manuel Delgado (born 19 May 1955) is a Spanish water polo player. He competed in the men's tournament at the 1980 Summer Olympics.

See also
 Spain men's Olympic water polo team records and statistics
 List of men's Olympic water polo tournament goalkeepers

References

External links
 

1955 births
Living people
Water polo players from Barcelona
Spanish male water polo players
Water polo goalkeepers
Olympic water polo players of Spain
Water polo players at the 1980 Summer Olympics
20th-century Spanish people